This is a comprehensive list of all of the commercially released recordings made by Orson Welles. Welles is heard on many recordings that were not intended for commercial release and for which he was not compensated.

Drama

Radio

Film

Interviews

Scores

Citizen Kane

"The Hitch-Hiker"

The Magnificent Ambersons

Macbeth

Othello

Touch of Evil

Chimes at Midnight

References

discography
Discographies of American artists
Works by Orson Welles